Sudhir Kumar Vempati is an Indian high energy physicist and a professor at the Centre for High Energy Physics of the Indian Institute of Science. He is known for his studies in neutrino physics, especially Large Hadron Collider Inverse problem and has published a number of articles, ResearchGate, an online repository of scientific articles has listed 76 of them. He is a member of the Indo-French Collaboration on High Energy Physics. The Council of Scientific and Industrial Research, the apex agency of the Government of India for scientific research, awarded him the Shanti Swarup Bhatnagar Prize for Science and Technology, one of the highest Indian science awards, for his contributions to physical sciences in 2016.

Selected bibliography

See also 

 Flavour (particle physics)
 Two-Higgs-doublet model

Notes

References

External links 
 
 
 

Recipients of the Shanti Swarup Bhatnagar Award in Physical Science
Indian scientific authors
Year of birth missing (living people)
Scientists from Karnataka
People from Bangalore
Indian physicists
Academic staff of the Indian Institute of Science
Living people
People from Andhra Pradesh
Telugu people